Samuel Alan McCandless (born January 28, 1971) is an American musician, songwriter, producer, and artist who is best known as a founding member of the American rock band Cold and the psychedelic blues band Carny.
With McCandless, Cold has released five albums of which two have been RIAA Certified Gold and one RIAA Certified Platinum soundtrack album for A Walk to Remember. He left the band in 2015, leaving vocalist Scooter Ward as the only original member. However, he later rejoined the band full-time in 2019, but left in 2021, when Tony Kruszka (of Lifer and University Drive) stepped in.

Career

Grundig
In 1986, McCandless formed the band Grundig along with several other students; Scooter Ward, Jeremy Marshall, and Matt Loughran at Fletcher High School in Neptune Beach, Florida. The band played their first gig in 1990 at a club called the Spray. In 1992, the band released an 8-song EP called "Into Everything" and moved to Atlanta, Georgia. Three and a half years later in 1995, Grundig broke up and McCandless, Ward, Kelly Hayes, and Pat Lally formed the band Diablo. Diablo would only last about 3 months.

Cold
At the end of that three-month period, Grundig reformed under the name Cold and signed a 6-album record deal with A&M Records. McCandless would remain with Cold until February 2006 when, after several line-up changes and battles with record labels, the band decided to break up. McCandless and Ward promptly began working on their new project The Witch, which McCandless has since left. The project has been renamed twice, When November Falls and now The Killer and the Star. In early 2009, Cold reformed for a reunion tour. Their album Superfiction was released on July 19, 2011.

McCandless was responsible for the design of the band's Spider logo which was influenced by Cold's "Oddity" EP cover (photographed by McCandless' wife, Georgia von Eberstein, of their pet spider "Wednesday").  The Spider Logo is now tattooed on thousands of Cold fans and is the trademark of the band.

In 2015, McCandless left Cold in search of other projects. However, he rejoined the band as a full-time member in 2019 until 2021.

Carny
Sam McCandless has worked with producer and guitarist Paul Leary of Butthole Surfers fame (as well as the  producer of Sublime's third album); Singer-songwriter Formica Iglesia, also of the band Carny.

Discography
Cold

Cold (1998)
13 Ways to Bleed on Stage (2000)
Year of the Spider (2003)
A Different Kind of Pain (2005)
Superfiction (2011)

References

Living people
American rock drummers
Musicians from Jacksonville, Florida
1971 births
Nu metal drummers
20th-century American drummers
American male drummers
21st-century American drummers
20th-century American male musicians
21st-century American male musicians